This is a list of instruments by Hornbostel-Sachs number, covering those instruments that are classified under 314.122 under that system (box zithers). These instruments are board zithers that use slats as resonators.

These instruments may be classified with a suffix, based on how the strings are caused to vibrate.

4: Hammers or beaters
5: Bare hands and fingers
6: Plectrum
7: Bowing
71: Using a bow
72: Using a wheel
73: Using a ribbon
8: Keyboard
9: Using a mechanical drive

List

References

Notes

314.122
Box zithers